Arnold Tartu (1 August 1910 Haljala Parish, Virumaa – 25 July 1986 Harku Selsoviet, Harju District) was an Estonian politician. He was a member of VI Riigikogu (its Chamber of Deputies).

References

1910 births
1986 deaths
Members of the Riigivolikogu
People from Haljala Parish
Burials at Pärnamäe Cemetery